Evelyn Insam (born 10 February 1994 in Brixen) is an Italian ski jumper and the 2013 National Champion.

Biography
Insam's debut at the FIS Ski Jumping World Cup took place in March 2011 in Lillehammer. Her best individual results were the two silver medals won at the World Cup in Schonach im Schwarzwald and at the Junior World Championships in Liberec in 2013.

Her younger brother Alex is also a ski jumper.

References

1994 births
Living people
Italian female ski jumpers
Olympic ski jumpers of Italy
Ski jumpers at the 2014 Winter Olympics
Ski jumpers at the 2018 Winter Olympics
Sportspeople from Brixen